Geitoneura minyas, the western xenica, is a species of butterfly from the family Nymphalidae, found in the south-west of the Australian state of Western Australia.

Description
The adults have orange wings with brown veins and markings. They have an eyespot on each forewing, and a vestigial eyespot on each hindwing. Their wingspan is approximately 3.5 cm.

The caterpillar is green and has a round head. It feeds on various types of grasses such as veldt grass.

References

Satyrini
Butterflies described in 1914
Butterflies of Australia